Adekokwok Hydroelectric Power Station is an  mini hydroelectric power project in Uganda.

Location
The power station is located in Adekokwok Village, Lira District, Lango sub-region in Uganda's Northern Region.

Overview
The power station was built at a cost of USh12 billion (approx. US$4 million). The power is integrated into the national grid and supplies the town of Lira and neighboring localities.

See also

List of power stations in Uganda
List of hydropower stations in Africa

References

External links
 Micro Dams To The Rescue
  

Lira District
Hydroelectric power stations in Uganda
Run-of-the-river power stations
Energy infrastructure completed in 2014
2014 establishments in Uganda
Dams in Uganda
Dams completed in 2014